The 1983 France – United Kingdom Maritime Boundary Convention is a 1983 treaty between France and the United Kingdom which establishes the maritime boundary between French Polynesia and the British territory of the Pitcairn Islands.

The treaty was signed in Paris on 25 October 1983. The text of the treaty sets out a boundary that is an equidistant line between the nearest islands of the two territories. The boundary is roughly north–south and consists of five straight-line maritime segments defined by six individual coordinate points.

The convention came into force on 12 April 1984, after both states had ratified it. In 1993, after the United Kingdom declared an Exclusive Economic Zone (EEZ) around the Pitcairn Islands, the two states agreed that the boundary set out in the 1983 treaty should also be the boundary between the French and British EEZs in the South Pacific.

The full name of the treaty is Convention on Maritime Boundaries between the Government of the French Republic and the Government of the United Kingdom of Great Britain and Northern Ireland.

See also
1996 France–United Kingdom Maritime Delimitation Agreements

Notes

References
 Anderson, Ewan W. (2003). International Boundaries: A Geopolitical Atlas. Routledge: New York. ;  OCLC 54061586
 Charney, Jonathan I., David A. Colson, Robert W. Smith. (2005). International Maritime Boundaries, 5 vols. Hotei Publishing: Leiden. ; ; ; ; ;  OCLC 23254092

External links
Full text of convention

France - United Kingdom Maritime Boundary Convention
France - United Kingdom Maritime Boundary Convention
France - United Kingdom Maritime Boundary Convention
France - United Kingdom Maritime Boundary Convention
Treaties concluded in 1983
French Polynesia–Pitcairn Islands border
Boundary treaties
History of the Pitcairn Islands
France–United Kingdom treaties
Treaties entered into force in 1984
United Nations treaties
Treaties extended to French Polynesia
Treaties extended to the Pitcairn Islands